Something Out of Nothing is a Bulgarian comedy film released in 1979, directed by Nikola Rudarov, starring Asen Kisimov, Stefan Danailov and Aneta Sotirova.

In a comical manner, the movie tells the story how the ridiculous prejudices of the people in the countryside can bring troubles just like that when two different lifestyles are faced to each other. The film perfectly shows the way of life of the typical Bulgarian family in the villages or the small towns from that time.

Cast
Asen Kisimov as the journalist (Pancho' class-fellow)
Stefan Danailov as Pancho
Aneta Sotirova as Pancho' wife
Stefan Kostov
Anna Pencheva
Dimitar Panov
Ivan Obretenov
Ivan Savov
Vesko Zehirev

References

Sources

External links
 
 Something Out of Nothing at the Bulgarian National Film Archive
 Something Out of Nothing at the Bulgarian National Television

1970s Bulgarian-language films
1979 films
1979 comedy films
Bulgarian comedy films
Films set in Bulgaria
Films shot in Bulgaria